Changgyr-Tash is a village in Jalal-Abad Region of Kyrgyzstan. It is part of the Suzak District. Its population was 4,845 in 2021.

References
 

Populated places in Jalal-Abad Region